Betqui or Betki is a village in the Ponda taluka (sub-district) of Goa.

Area, population

Its location code on the 2011 Census of India is 626844.

According to the official 2011 Census, Betqui or Betki in Ponda taluka has an area of 629 hectares, a total of 382 households, a population of 1,707 (comprising 871 males and 836 females) with an under-six population of 151 (comprising 77 boys and 74 girls).

Location
Betqui is located in the north-eastern corner of Ponda taluka.  It is near to Candola or Khandola, Orgao, Banastarim and Volvoi.

Postal services

Betki B.O.  is a delivery-based branch office, connected to the Marcela S.O.  which lies under the Goa Division of the Panaji Region and the Maharashtra Circle for postal services.  Betki's PIN code is 403107.  It is located in North Goa.  Betki shares this PIN code with Amona B.O., Banastarim B.O., Cumbharjua B.O.  and the Marcela B.O.

Environment
The Betki-Khandola area was said to be the centre of illegal sand mining in December 2020.

According to Rajendra P. Kerkar, writing in 2018, the Mandodarichem tollem in Betqui is one of Goa's largest "man-made lakes". But the lake has silted and faced sustained neglect over the years. The lake is associated with the ancient Shree Mandodari Temple.

References

Villages in North Goa district